The Human Resources Manager (translit. Shliḥuto shel Ha'Memuneh al Mash'abey Enosh) is a 2010 Israeli drama film directed by Eran Riklis. It was written by Noah Stollman, based on the 2006 book A Woman in Jerusalem by A. B. Yehoshua. The film tells the story of a bakery's human-resources manager (unnamed, like most of the film's characters) who reluctantly travels to Eastern Europe to bring the body of a deceased former employee, a recent immigrant to Israel, back to her family, in order to prevent a public-relations disaster for his company. The first half of the film is set in, and was filmed in, Jerusalem, while the second half was filmed in Romania, although the name of the country is never specified in the film.

The Human Resources Manager won five Ophir Awards, for Best Film, Director, Screenplay, Supporting Actress (Rozina Cambos) and Soundtrack. The film was also selected as the Israeli entry for the Best Foreign Language Film at the 83rd Academy Awards, but it did not make the final shortlist.

Cast
 Mark Ivanir as The Human Resources Manager
 Reymond Amsalem as The Divorcee
 Gila Almagor as The Widow
 Noah Silver as The Boy
  as The Weasel
 Irina Petrescu as The Grandmother
 Julian Negulesco as The Vice Consul
 Rozina Cambos as The Consul
 Bogdan E. Stanoevitch as The Ex-Husband
 Ofir Weil as The Morgue Worker
 Roni Koren as The Daughter
 Papil Panduru as The Driver
 Danna Semo as The Secretary
 Sylwia Drori as The Nun

See also
 List of submissions to the 83rd Academy Awards for Best Foreign Language Film
 List of Israeli submissions for the Academy Award for Best Foreign Language Film

References

External links

2010 films
Israeli drama films
2010s Hebrew-language films
2010 drama films
Films directed by Eran Riklis
Films shot in Romania
Films set in Jerusalem